Doranna Durgin is an American author. In 1995 she won the Compton Crook Award for the novel Dun Lady's Jess.

Durgin's works feature suspense elements and distinctive descriptions of animals and their behavior.

Works

The Changespell Saga 
Fantasy novels about Dun Lady's Jess, a spirited young mare, her rider Carey, and their friends.
 Dun Lady's Jess Baen 1994 , reprinted 2007 Star Ink 
 Changespell Baen 1997 
 Changespell Legacy Baen 2002 
 Barrenlands (prequel) Baen 1998

The King's Wolf Saga 
Reandn and friends.
 Touched by Magic Baen 1996 
  Wolf Justice Baen 1998

Star Trek
Tooth and Claw (2001). . Based on the Star Trek: The Next Generation television series, set in the year 2371.

Buffyverse
Novels relating to the fictional universe established by Buffy and Angel:
 Tales of the Slayer, Vol. 1 (2003, short story)
 Impressions (Angel novel) (2003)
 Fearless (Angel novel) (2003)
 Short stories within The Longest Night (Angel novel) (2002)

Other works
 Seer's Blood Baen 2000 
 Feral Darkness Baen 2001 
 Mage Knight 2: Dark Debts Ballantine 2003 
 Wolverine's Daughter Baen 2000

References

External links
 Doranna Durgin's Webstead
 Fantasticfiction.co.uk - Bookography
 Blue Hound Visions Doranna Durgin's web design business.

20th-century American novelists
21st-century American novelists
20th-century American women writers
21st-century American women writers
Year of birth missing (living people)
Living people
American fantasy writers
Women science fiction and fantasy writers
American women novelists